Southwest Ranches is a town in Broward County, Florida, United States. It is a suburban community part of the Miami metropolitan area and is located on the eastern edge of the Everglades, 15 miles (24 km) southwest of Fort Lauderdale and about 22 miles  (35 km) northwest of Miami. It became the county's 30th incorporated place in 2000 to avoid annexation into Pembroke Pines and to preserve its semirural lifestyle. Because the area has many horse ranches and is located in the southwestern part of Broward County, residents chose "Southwest Ranches" over other potential town names.

The population at the 2020 census was 7,607. The town includes the 2000 census-designated places of Country Estates, Green Meadow, Ivanhoe Estates, Rolling Oaks, and Sunshine Ranches (as well as subneighborhoods Landmark Ranch Estates and Sterling Ranch Estates), all of which are now Southwest Ranches neighborhoods. To support its rural-equestrian lifestyle, the town has developed many equestrian trails.

History
Prior to European colonization, the Tequesta were the native people in the southeastern part of Florida for almost 2,000 years from 500 BCE to the 18th century CE when the Spanish conquered Florida. In the 1970s archeologist excavated a Tequesta burial site, with artifacts that go back to more than a thousand years, that was part of a former Everglades tree island. There is also an old Indian trading post in the town.

In 1996, Pembroke Pines proposed a bill to the Broward County Legislative Delegation to annex all the unincorporated areas between Griffin Road, Sheridan Street, Flamingo Road, and SR 25 into Pembroke Pines. Hundreds of citizens from the unincorporated area of Southwest Ranches packed the delegation hearing in November 1996 at Pembroke Pines City Hall to protest this takeover and to call for the right to form their own city. As a result of this grassroots effort, the State Legislature passed a bill in the 1997 session that called for a vote of Southwest Ranches' citizens in March 2000; they could be annexed into either Pembroke Pines or Davie, or become a new city.

Southwest Ranches Homeowners Association was an umbrella group composed of individual homeowners associations in the Southwest Ranches area. Anyone belonging to an individual homeowners association was also automatically a member of the group, with full voting rights. In 1997, its members agreed to actively promote incorporation of a new city for the area and formed a political committee to explore this option. A feasibility committee was appointed to determine if a new city would be viable. They would have to know if revenues would be adequate to cover the costs of running a city. Dr. Milan Dluhy of Florida International University was contacted and asked to complete a formal feasibility study; Dluhy had produced many such studies for groups that subsequently became successful cities. The committee also contacted Moyer and Associates, the company that provides contract services to Weston.

The feasibility committee determined that a contract city would be the best option. Contracting would allow the city access to experienced professionals without having to hire these individuals on a full-time basis. This would save taxpayers money and avoid many costly capital expenses. Moyer and Associates provided the feasibility committee and Dr. Dluhy with financial information on which to base estimates of both income and expenses. The committee also considered the figures provided by the PMG study. PMG is the company  hired by Broward County to conduct a study comparing the costs of Pembroke Pines and Davie to the costs of being incorporated into a new city.

On July 3, 1999, the Southwest Ranches Homeowners Association sponsored a parade and picnic to declare the area's independence. Speakers at the event included then-Senator Howard Forman,  Representative Debbie Wasserman Schultz, County Commissioner Lori Parrish, Sheriff Ken Jenne, and Weston Mayor Harry Rosen. The bill passed in 1997 authorized the vote in 2000 to determine if residents wanted to form their own city. If the vote was for a new city, a charter was to be drawn up and an election forming the city held in 2001. Leaders realized, however, that if a charter could be drawn up sooner, it could be approved in 2000 and the city formed a year earlier, which would be financially beneficial to the residents.

A charter committee was formed to draw up a charter. The committee met almost weekly during July and August 1999, and formulated a new charter, using the Weston charter as a template. A contest was held to name the town, with 122 different names submitted. A vote was held on October 12, 1999 to select one of the top five names, which Southwest Ranches won. Southwest Ranches Homeowners Association members voted to move forward and request a local bill to allow incorporation in 2000 instead of 2001, which was approved. On March 14, 2000, residents voted overwhelmingly to form a new town rather than be annexed.

The most contentious issue during charter committee meetings was whether or not to have districts. The majority of members felt that council members should be elected at large, meaning that any qualified candidate could run for a seat, no matter where that individual lived, but some felt that candidates should only be able to run if they lived in one of four districts. When the election to approve the charter was held on June 6, 2000, the issue was put to a vote, and the majority of voters selected districts. Council members were elected on July 25, 2000, and the town was officially established.

Some are small farms and equestrian ranches. The town has laws that keep homes from being built on lots less than an acre. To conserve the town's rural lifestyle, the laws also generally prevent streetlights and sidewalks from being constructed.

Demographics

2020 census

As of the 2020 United States census, there were 7,607 people, 2,235 households, and 1,861 families residing in the town.

2010 census

As of 2010, 2,389 households were available, with 6.2% vacant. As of 2000, before annexation to Southwest Ranches, the Country Estates neighborhood had speakers of English as a first language accounted for 78.46% of all residents, while Spanish as a mother tongue made up 21.53% of the population.

2000 census
As of 2000, before being annexed to Southwest Ranches, the Green Meadow neighborhood had English as a first language accounted for 82.09% of all residents, while Spanish as a mother tongue made up 17.90% of the population.

As of 2000, before being annexed to Southwest Ranches, the Rolling Oaks neighborhood had English as a first language accounted for 70.42% of all residents, while Spanish as a mother tongue made up 29.57% of the population.

As of 2000, before being annexed to Southwest Ranches, the Sunshine Ranches neighborhood had English as a first language accounted for 76.22% of all residents, while Spanish as a mother tongue accounted for 22.16%, and Italian made up 1.61% of the population.

Economy
The Florida Department of Corrections operates the Region IV Correctional Facility Office on the grounds of Broward Correctional Institution in the former Country Estates CDP and in Southwest Ranches. The Broward prison formerly housed the female death row, which was moved to the Lowell Correctional Institution in February 2003.

Parks and recreation
To support its rural-equestrian lifestyle, the town has developed miles of multiuse trails. People can be often be seen riding horses or bicycles or walking the trails that spread throughout the town. Since incorporation, the town has also acquired seven open-space parks, only one of which has been developed so far. This park includes a schooling ring, a show ring, and the Equestrian Oasis, an art installation primarily used to provide drinking water for horses.

Government
From the time of its founding until 2012, the town conducted its business from a modular office at the South Broward Drainage District headquarters. In 2012, the town, under the leadership of Vice Mayor Doug McKay, renovated a former church to create Southwest Ranches' first permanent town hall. Police and emergency services are provided by the nearby town of Davie.

Southwest Ranches' charter defines the governing body as a council with one mayor and four council members. The mayor and the council members are elected at large from the electorate of the town, but the council members represent districts in which they must reside. The mayoral role is largely ceremonial with no more power than any council member. Other charter positions serving Southwest Ranches include the town administrator, financial administrator, and town clerk.

The town's first council consisted of Mayor Mecca Fink, Vice Mayor Johnny Dollar, Forrest Blanton, Freddy Fisikelli, and Astor Knight.

Education
Southwest Ranches is served by Broward County Public Schools.

Notable people

 River Alexander, actor
 Ricou Browning, actor and film producer
 Vernon Carey, American football player
 Miss Cleo, television psychic
 Daunte Culpepper, American football player
 Karlos Dansby, American football player
 Udonis Haslem, basketball player
 Dwayne Johnson, actor and former professional wrestler
 Raw Leiba, actor and film producer
 Uncle Louie, actor, talent manager, and former Homeland Security employee
 Reggie Wayne, American football player

In media
In April 2019, the WSVN show Deco Drive featured a Southwest Ranches farm owned by Uncle Louie.

References

External links
 Town of Southwest Ranches

Towns in Broward County, Florida
Towns in Florida